Malinová is a village and municipality in Prievidza District in the Trenčín Region of western Slovakia. It lies about 15 km north of the town of Prievidza.

Evolution of the village name

The village of Malinová was called by many different names over the centuries:

 1339 Chach
 1437 Cheche
 1464 Czecza/Posega
 1485 Czecha/Pozega
 1486, 1488, 1490 Czecze, Zech 
 1489 Chech
 1571-1573 Czek
 1927-1948 Czach, since 1938 also Zeche 
 since 1948 Malinová

History
In historical records the village was first mentioned in 1339. The village belonged to a German language island. The German population was expelled in 1945.

Timeline
 1339 Foundation
 1431 Church badly damaged by the Hussites
 1612 First evidence of gold washing
 1642-08-08 Charter of Count Paul Pálffy ("Wasserverbot")
 1726 The office of the town judge is sold to the landlord
 1788 The gothic church is built, the town becomes an independent parish
 1822 The Trinity is built
 1846/1847 Rectory and school are rebuilt
 1806, 1840, 1663 Serious fires
 1869 Building of St. Mary's chapel
 1870 The church is closed due to danger of collapse

Geography
Area: 13.1 km²
Population: 910
Location: 
Altitude in m above sea level: 345

Places of interest

Books
 Schlenker, M. (1986). Von Heimat zu Heimat. Stuttgart: Hilfsbund der Karpatendeutschen Katholiken.

References

External links
 
 
https://web.archive.org/web/20071217080336/http://www.statistics.sk/mosmis/eng/run.html
 Information about Malinova (In Slovak)

Villages and municipalities in Prievidza District
1339 establishments in Europe